Intuition is the second album by American jazz trumpeter Wallace Roney which was recorded in 1988 and released on the Muse label.

Reception

The AllMusic review by Scott Yanow stated, "the music is as strong as one would expect, reflecting Roney's long stint with the Tony Williams Quintet".

Track listing
All compositions by Wallace Roney except where noted
 "Intuition" (Cindy Blackman) − 5:43
 "Opus One Point Five" (Ron Carter) − 5:40
 "Ahead" − 7:57
 "Taberah" − 5:49
 "Sometimes My Heart Cries" (Blackman) − 5:34
 "For Duke" − 8:22
 "Willow Weep for Me" (Ann Ronell) − 8:24 additional track on CD release

Personnel 
Wallace Roney − trumpet
Kenny Garrett − alto saxophone (tracks 1-3, 5 & 6)
Gary Thomas − tenor saxophone (tracks 1 & 4-6)
Mulgrew Miller − piano 
Ron Carter − bass
Cindy Blackman − drums

References 

1988 albums
Wallace Roney albums
Albums recorded at Van Gelder Studio
Muse Records albums